Julius Sedame (born 16 December 1974) is a Ghanaian sprinter. He competed in the men's 4 × 400 metres relay at the 1996 Summer Olympics.

References

1974 births
Living people
Athletes (track and field) at the 1996 Summer Olympics
Ghanaian male sprinters
Olympic athletes of Ghana
Place of birth missing (living people)